Helen Kane (born Helen Clare Schroeder, August 4, 1904 – September 26, 1966) was an American singer and actress. Her signature song was "I Wanna Be Loved by You" (1928), featured in the 1928 stage musical Good Boy. The song was written for Good Boy by the songwriting team Kalmar and Ruby. Kane's voice and appearance were thought to be a source for Fleischer Studios animators when creating Betty Boop. Kane attempted to sue the studio for claims of stealing her signature "boop-oop-a-doop" style, but the judge decided that the proof of this was insufficient, thus dismissing the case.

Early life
Kane attended St. Anselm's Parochial School in The Bronx, New York City. She was the youngest of three children. Her father, Louis Schroeder, a German immigrant, was employed intermittently as a wagon driver; her Irish-immigrant mother, Ellen (born Dixon) Schroeder, worked in a laundry.

Kane's mother reluctantly paid $3 (approximately a day's pay) for her daughter's costume as a queen in Kane's first theatrical role at school. By the time she was 15 years old, Kane was onstage professionally, touring the Orpheum Circuit with the Marx Brothers in On the Balcony.

She spent the early 1920s trouping in vaudeville as a singer and kickline dancer with a theater engagement called the "All Jazz Revue". She played the New York Palace for the first time in 1921. Her Broadway days started there, as well with the Stars of the Future (1922–24, and a brief revival in early 1927). She also sang onstage with an early singing trio, the Hamilton Sisters and Fordyce, later known as The Three X Sisters.

Kane's roommate in the early 1920s was Jessie Fordyce. The singing trio act might have become the Hamilton Sisters and Schroeder, but Pearl Hamilton chose Fordyce to tour as a trio act "just to see what happens" at the end of the theatrical season.

Music
Kane's career break came in 1927, when she appeared in a musical called A Night in Spain. It ran from May 3 through Nov 12, 1927, for a total of 174 performances, at the 44th Street Theatre in New York City. Subsequently, Paul Ash, a band conductor, put Kane's name forward for a performance at New York's Paramount Theater.

Kane's first performance at the Paramount Theater in Times Square proved to be her career's launching point. She was singing "That's My Weakness Now", when she interpolated the scat lyrics "boop-oop-a-doop". This resonated with the flapper culture, and four days later, Helen Kane's name went up in lights.

In Oscar Hammerstein's 1928 show Good Boy, she first introduced the hit "I Wanna Be Loved by You". Then it was back to the Palace, as a headliner for $5,000 a week. She rejoined her friends from vaudeville, The Three X Sisters (formerly The Hamilton Sisters and Fordyce) for one night. In a 1935 live stage performance, she harmonized with their unique banter to a novelty tune, "The Preacher and the Bear".

Kane had excellent diction, intonation, and timing, learned during her apprenticeship in vaudeville. Her songs have a strong word focus and capitalize on her coquettish voice. She blended several fashionable styles of the late 1920s. These included scat singing, a kind of vocal improvisation, and also blending singing and speech. Sprechgesang ("speech-song") was fashionable at this time in Germany's Weimar Republic in both nightclubs and in serious music.

Kane recorded 22 songs between 1928 and 1930. After 1930 and up to 1951, she recorded four sides for Columbia Records in addition to the Three Little Words soundtrack single recording of "I Wanna Be Loved by You".
She also recorded four songs that comprise a 1954 MGM 45Ep entitled "The Boop Boop a Doop Girl".

Films
In early 1929, Paramount Pictures signed Kane to make a series of musicals at a salary of as much as $8,000 a week (equivalent to over $120,000 in 2020).

Her films were:
1929: Nothing But the Truth, a comedy starring Richard Dix
1929: Sweetie, a college musical, which starred Nancy Carroll, Jack Oakie and Stanley Smith
1929: Pointed Heels, which starred William Powell and Fay Wray
1930: Paramount on Parade, an all-star extravaganza
1930: Dangerous Nan McGrew, with Stuart Erwin, Frank Morgan, and Victor Moore
1930: Heads Up!, starring Buddy Rogers and Victor Moore
1931: A Lesson in Love, a musical short film

Although Kane was not the "star" of most of her pictures (with Dangerous Nan McGrew being the one exception), she was so popular that in the case of Sweetie, her name appeared over the title on the marquee when the movie premiered at the New York Paramount (although Nancy Carroll was the true star). Kane provided all the fun, and Jack Oakie and she danced to "The Prep Step", a big hit along with "He's So Unusual". They even performed this dance at the first Hollywood Bowl fundraiser on August 7, 1929. Another hit from this picture was Nancy Carroll's "My Sweeter Than Sweet".

In the opening credits of Pointed Heels, Kane and William Powell are billed on the same line just below the title, with Fay Wray and the rest in smaller letters underneath. She had equal billing with Buddy Rogers in Heads Up!, and their faces appeared in all the ads. In Dangerous Nan McGrew, Kane received top billing in the film's credits.

Kane v. Fleischer
[[File:Helen Kane and Betty Boop - Photoplay, April 1932.jpg|thumb|267px|right|This comparison between Kane and Betty Boop was published in Photoplays April 1932 issue, one month before the lawsuit was filed.]]

In 1930, Fleischer Studios animators introduced what was alleged to be a caricature of Helen Kane, with droopy dog ears and a squeaky singing voice, in the Talkartoons cartoon Dizzy Dishes. "Betty Boop", as the character was later dubbed, soon became popular and the star of her own cartoons. In 1932, Betty Boop was changed into a human, the long dog ears becoming hoop earrings.

In 1932, Kane filed a lawsuit against Max Fleischer and Paramount for damages of $250,000 (equivalent to $4.7 million in 2020), alleging infringement, unfair competition and exploitation of her personality and image. Before his death, cartoonist Grim Natwick admitted he had designed a young girl based upon a photo of Kane. Margie Hines, Mae Questel, Bonnie Poe, Little Ann Little, and Kate Wright provided the voice for Betty Boop. They had all taken part in a 1929 Paramount contest, which was a search for Helen Kane impersonators.

The trial took place in April and early May 1934, and lasted approximately two weeks. It was claimed in court that Kane based her style in part on Baby Esther, a child African American dancer and entertainer of the late 1920s, known for impersonating Florence Mills. Variety stated Esther was seven years old, Esther had arrived for the first time in New York City in mid-1928, playing in a pocket-sized nightclub called The Everglades.Variety, July 11, 1928, pg 33 Theatrical manager Lou Bolton offered testimony during the Kane v. Fleischer trial to convey the impression that Helen Kane adopted Baby Esther's boops to further her own popularity as a singer. Esther's act at The Everglades included an impersonation of the late Florence Mills. Under cross-examination Bolton said that he had met with Kane at the club after Esther's performance, but could not say when she had walked in. Bolton also stated that Fleischer's lawyers had paid him $200 to come to New York. The Fleischers used as defense a film of Baby Esther, made in 1928, featuring her singing three songs that had earlier been popularized by Helen Kane – "Don't Be Like That", "Is There Anything Wrong with That?"" and "Wa-da-da" – which writer Mark Langer says "was hardly proof that Helen Kane derived her singing style from Baby Esther". However Jazz Studies scholar Robert O'Meally stated this evidence might very well have been fabricated by the Fleischers to discredit Kane, whom they later admitted to have been their model for Betty Boop. O'Meally also questioned if there was some sort of deal between Fleischer Studios and Bolton, and questioned if Esther was ever paid for her presumed loss of revenue.

Other attempts to discredit Kane at the trial came in the form of phonograph recordings of Annette Hanshaw and the Duncan Sisters, and a piece of 1915 sheet music that was entitled Bou Dou BaDa Bou (which was actually French, and was not "scat" because it was someone's name). The five women who did the Betty Boop voice in the cartoons also testified, claiming they always 'booped' that way, even around the house. Based on the totality of the information presented before him and without a jury, Judge McGoldrick found "insufficient evidence to support the plaintiff's claim" and found in favor of the defendants on May 5, 1934. 

Later years
With the hardships of the Great Depression biting, the flamboyant world of the flapper was over, and Kane's style began to date rapidly. After 1931, she lost the favor of the moviemakers, who chose other singers for their films. She appeared in a stage production called Shady Lady in 1933,  sang weekly on the radio, and made appearances at various nightclubs and theatres during the 1930s.

In 1950, she dubbed Debbie Reynolds, who performed "I Wanna Be Loved by You" in the MGM musical biopic of songwriters Bert Kalmar and Harry Ruby, Three Little Words. She did not appear in the film's credits.

She appeared on several TV shows in the 1950s and 1960s, principally Toast of the Town, later known as The Ed Sullivan Show. Kane's final public appearance was on the Sullivan Show on St. Patrick's Day 1965.

In addition, Kane was given a tribute in 1958 on This Is Your Life with Ralph Edwards. It brought a tearful reunion with her old friend, actress Fifi D'Orsay, and a lifelong fan who once sent her money when she was down on her luck. Renewed interest in Kane brought her a one-record contract with MGM Records and appearances on I've Got a Secret and You Asked for It. She sang on all of these TV shows.

Personal life

In November 1924, Helen Schroeder married department store buyer Joseph Kane and took his last name professionally. The marriage was over by 1925 when she left to go back on the road, ended in 1928, and she went to Mexico to get a final divorce in December 1932. In February 1933 she married actor and son of Gertrude Hoffmann Max Hoffmann Jr. After six months he deserted her and Kane filed for divorce. The divorce was finalized in May 1935. In 1939 she married Dan Healy, with whom she had worked in Good Boy in 1928. They opened a restaurant in New York City called Healy's Grill. She remained married to Healy for the rest of her life. Kane had no children, although she did sponsor godchildren.

Death
Helen Kane battled breast cancer for more than a decade. She had surgery in 1956 and eventually received two hundred radiation treatments as an outpatient at Memorial Hospital. She died on September 26, 1966, at age 62, in her apartment in Jackson Heights, Queens, New York City. Her husband of 27 years, Dan Healy, was at her bedside. Helen Kane was buried in Long Island National Cemetery, in Suffolk County, New York.

Discography

The release dates of recordings 1 to 22 are derived from the cover notes of the CD Helen Kane - Great Original Performances - 1928 to 1930 (RPCD 323).

In 1954, MGM records issued the last Helen Kane recordings as a 45-rpm Ep X1164 called "The Boop-Boop-A-Doop Girl!", orchestra directed by Leroy Holmes, and the songs are "When My Sugar Walks Down the Street", "When I Get You Alone Tonight, Do Something" (from Nothing But the Truth) and "That's My Weakness Now".

ReferencesBibliographyNew York Times, "Helen Kane Dead; Boop-A-Doop Girl", September 27, 1966, p. 47.Further reading'''
 Helen Kane and Betty Boop. On Stage and On Trial.'' James D. Taylor Jr. Algora Publishing, New York. 2017. . Biography.

External links

Helen Kane: The Original Boop-Boop-a-Doop Girl
Helen Kane appreciates art 
Dangerous Nan McGrew

Helen Kane at TCM

Helen Kane at Allstars

1904 births
1966 deaths
American women pop singers
American film actresses
American musical theatre actresses
American people of German descent
American people of Irish descent
American voice actresses
Burials at Long Island National Cemetery
Deaths from cancer in New York (state)
Deaths from breast cancer
Singers from New York (state)
People from Jackson Heights, Queens
People from the Bronx
Vaudeville performers
Paramount Pictures contract players
20th-century American actresses
20th-century American women singers
20th-century American singers